Gestenstücke ("Pieces with gestures" or "gesture pieces") is a key work by Argentine-born composer Juan María Solare for four performers (mimes). In this piece, mute gestures are ordered with musical rules, following Solare's main conception of Neues Musiktheater: "To order non-musical elements (even non-sounding ones) with musical rules". [Quotation needeed]

The work was composed in a hurry in the train Berlin to Bremen on 13 April 2008 (Solare needed urgently new material for his seminar on music theatre at the University of Bremen) with a total duration of about 13 minutes. Its parts are:

Compositions by Juan María Solare